Hradivka is a village in Voznesensk Raion, Mykolaiv Oblast, Ukraine. It belongs to Veselynove settlement hromada, one of the hromadas of Ukraine. 

Until 18 July 2020, Hradivka belonged to Veselynove Raion. In July 2020, as part of the administrative reform of Ukraine, which reduced the number of raions of Mykolaiv Oblast to four, Veselynove Raion was merged into Voznesensk Raion.

References

Villages in Voznesensk Raion